

Composition of the troupe of the Comédie-Française in 1790 
The theatrical year began 12 April 1790 and ended 16 April 1791.

Sources 
 Almanach général de tous les spectacles de Paris et des provinces, pour l'année 1791, Paris 1791.

1790
1790 in France